Haemulon vittatum, the boga, is an ocean-going species of grunt native to the western Atlantic Ocean.  Bogas are also known as the snit in Jamaica, and  bonnetmouth in the Bahamas.  It was first described by  Cuban zoologist Felipe Poey. This species used to be classified as Inermia vittata, but genetic data revealed that it belongs to the genus Haemulon.

Description

Haemulon vittatum is a spindle-shaped fish. It has a deeply forked caudal fin, and its two dorsal fins are close together. It is also able to protrude its mouth much further than many fishes, hence the name bonnetmouth. They usually have 14-15 spines on their dorsal fins, but only 10 soft rays. They have two spines and 9 rays on their anal fins, as well. The longest recorded Boga was 23 cm in length
The boga’s life colors are generally greenish above, and blueish-white below. A greenish stripe, tinged with yellow, can be seen from the eye to the tail. Three similar stripes are on the back. The snout and dorsal fins are both yellowish or pale yellow, while the caudal fin is dusky violet. The pectoral fins are both rosy, and the anal and ventral fins are both white.

Distribution and habitat
Haemulon vittatum is only known from the western Atlantic Ocean from Florida and the Bahamas south to northern South America, including the Antilles and the Caribbean.

Occurring in open water, Bogas are sometimes found near coasts or over reefs they can mainly be found off of oceanic islands, where they feed on zooplankton and smaller fishes. Bogas are occasionally sold fresh, and used as baitfish; they are known to be preyed upon by the red hind (Epinephelus guttatus), a member of the grouper family.

Systematics
Haemolon vittatum was first formally described as Inermia vittata in 1860 by the Cuban zoologist Felipe Poey (1799-1891) with the type locality given as Havana. The specific name vittatum means "banded", banded, this is assmed to refer to the wide greenish stripe running from the  eye to the base of caudal fin and the 3-4 brownish stripes above it.

References

External links
 

vittatum
Fauna of the Southeastern United States
Fish of the Caribbean
Fish described in 1860